The 2013 18U Baseball World Cup was an international baseball competition held in Taichung and Yunlin (Douliu), Taiwan from August 30 to September 8, 2013. There were no games played on August 30 and August 31, due to rain.

Medalists

Teams
The following 12 teams qualified for the tournament.

 
 Chinese Taipei is the official IBAF designation for the team representing the state officially referred to as the Republic of China, more commonly known as Taiwan. (See also political status of Taiwan for details.)

Round 1

Group A

|}

Group B

|}

Round 2

5th place game

3rd place game

Final

See also
 List of sporting events in Taiwan

References

World Junior Baseball Championship
U-18 Baseball World Cup